Poitou-Charentes is a former administrative region on the southwest coast of France. It is part of the new region Nouvelle-Aquitaine. It comprises four departments: Charente, Charente-Maritime, Deux-Sèvres and Vienne. Historical provinces are Angoumois, Aunis, Saintonge and Poitou.

The regional capital is Poitiers. Other important cities are La Rochelle, Niort, Angoulême, Châtellerault, Saintes, Rochefort and Royan.

Poitou-Charentes was merged with Aquitaine and Limousin to form the new administrative region of Nouvelle-Aquitaine on January 1, 2016.

Politics
The regional council is composed of 56 members. The region is the home of France's losing presidential candidate Socialist Ségolène Royal in the election of 2007.

Demographics
In French, the region's residents are known as Picto-Charentais. In 2003, the region ranked 15th out of 26 in population. In area it ranked 12th in size.

Three regional languages, Poitevin, Saintongeais and Occitan (Limousin, Marchois) are spoken by a minority of people in the region.

Southern Poitou-Charentes and Aquitaine is believed to be the region of origin of the Acadian and Cajun populations of North America, such as in New Brunswick, Louisiana, Nova Scotia, Prince Edward Island, the Gaspe Peninsula of Quebec and Maine. Their ancestors emigrated from the region in the 17th and 18th centuries.

At first, these French immigrants from the rural areas of Poitou-Charentes settled in what is now eastern Canada, and established an agricultural and maritime economy (farming and fishing). This area of the "New World" was dubbed Acadia by the French, after the Greek Arcadia - the idyllic part of the Peloponnesian peninsula in Greece. As an alternate theory, some historians suggest that the name is derived from the indigenous Canadian Mikmaq language, in which Cadie means "fertile land". It was renamed Nova Scotia (New Scotland) in the aftermath of the 1755 expulsion of most of the Acadians by the English.

History

Poitou is a historic region in west central France. Poitiers, the capital of the region, is its chief city, although the port of La Rochelle, capital of the province of Aunis, rivals it in economic importance. Farming is important to the economy; wheat, corn and cattle are farmed. Industries produce machinery, chemicals and dairy products.

The region's first known inhabitants, the Pictavi, a Gallic tribe, were conquered in 56 BC by the Romans, who then incorporated the area into Gaul as part of the province of Aquitania, with the Iberian Aquitani tribes. The Visigoths seized the region in 418 AD, but it passed to the Franks in 507. In 732 or 733, Charles Martel brought the Muslim invasion of Western Europe to a standstill by his victory in the Battle of Poitiers. From the 10th to the mid-12th century, the counts of Poitou were also the dukes of Aquitaine, and the city of Poitiers grew in importance.

In 1152, Poitou came under English control through the marriage of Eleanor of Aquitaine to Henry II (later king of England). The region was reunited with the French crown in 1416 and was a province of France until the Revolution (1789–95), when it was divided into three departments, Vienne, Deux-Sèvres, and Vendée.

Françoise-Athénaïs, marquise de Montespan was born in the area in 1640 (d 1707). She was the famous mistress to Louis XIV; Some of their descendants are still alive today.

Major communities

Angoulême
Bressuire
Châtellerault
Cognac
La Rochelle
Niort
Melle
Poitiers
Rochefort
Royan
Saintes

References

External links
 Poitou-Charentes : starting out from the South West - Official French website (in English)
  Regional Council Website
 Official Regional Tourist Board website
 Short tourist guide to Poitou-Charentes
  Site de l'Observatoire Régional de l'Environnement de Poitou-Charentes
  Site sur la biodiversité en Poitou-Charentes
  Youth portal for Poitou-Charentes
 Pause Poitou-Charentes - property, lifestyle and leisure website

 
Nouvelle-Aquitaine
Former regions of France
NUTS 2 statistical regions of the European Union
1956 establishments in France
States and territories established in 1956
2015 disestablishments in France
States and territories disestablished in 2015